High Hill School, also known as High Hill Community Building, is a historic school building located at High Hill, Montgomery County, Missouri.  It was built in 1867, and is two-story, Greek Revival style frame building with a gable roof.  It is topped by a six-sided belfry with ogee-arched louvered openings and hexagonal roof. It housed a school until 1954, after which it became a community center.

It was listed on the National Register of Historic Places in 1980.

References

School buildings on the National Register of Historic Places in Missouri
Greek Revival architecture in Missouri
School buildings completed in 1867
Buildings and structures in Montgomery County, Missouri
National Register of Historic Places in Montgomery County, Missouri